Jean Strouse (born 1945) is an American biographer, cultural administrator, and critic. She is best known for her biographies of diarist Alice James and financier J. Pierpont Morgan.

Strouse was an editorial assistant at The New York Review of Books from 1967 to 1969.  She was a book critic at Newsweek magazine from 1979 to 1983, and won a MacArthur Fellowship in September, 2001. She has also held fellowships from the John Simon Guggenheim Memorial Foundation, the National Endowment for the Humanities, and the National Endowment for the Arts. She has contributed reviews and essays on literary and other topics to the New York Times Book Review, The New York Review of Books, The New Yorker, and Vogue. In 2003 Strouse was appointed the Sue Ann and John Weinberg Director of the Dorothy and Lewis B. Cullman Center for Scholars and Writers at the New York Public Library.
 
Strouse's book Alice James: A Biography, appeared in 1980 and won a Bancroft Prize. A sympathetic but objective look at the younger sister of philosopher William James and novelist Henry James, the biography showed how Alice James struggled through various illnesses to create her memorable diary. Strouse's next book, Morgan: American Financier (1999), earned praise for its realistic, unexaggerated portrayal of Morgan's personality and its explanations of complex financial topics in understandable terms. Strouse has also edited two books by Henry James: the Library of America's edition of James' 1864-74 short stories, and the NYRB edition of James' last completed novel, The Outcry.

Strouse graduated from Radcliffe College in 1967.

References

External links
Interview with Jean Strouse on her biography of J. Pierpont Morgan

Announcement of the New York Public Library appointment of Jean Strouse (with photo)
Jean Strouse's introduction to the NYRB edition of The Outcry by Henry James

1945 births
Living people
MacArthur Fellows
American biographers
Radcliffe College alumni
Harvard Advocate alumni
Bancroft Prize winners